Laning is a commune in the Moselle department in Lorraine in north-eastern France.

Laning may also refer to:

 Laning (surname), a surname
 USS Laning (DE-159), a Buckley-class destroyer escort

See also

 Lane (disambiguation)
 Laner
 Lanes (disambiguation)